The 2009 Oakland Raiders season was the 50th season for the original American Football League team, and its 40th in the NFL. On September 6, 2009, The Raiders traded a 2011 draft pick to the New England Patriots for ×5 Pro Bowl Defensive Lineman Richard Seymour. With their loss to Dallas on November 26, 2009, The Raiders sealed their seventh consecutive losing season. After beating the Pittsburgh Steelers on December 6, 2009, the Raiders moved to 4–0 when playing Pittsburgh the year they won the Super Bowl, or are the defending Champions, winning in 1974, 1980, 2006, and now 2009.

Off Season

Draft

Local TV Blackouts
In 2009, once again the Raiders struggled to sell tickets, resulting in 7 of their 8 home games being blacked out on local television. The Raiders were able to sell out their season opener, on Monday Night Football against the Chargers, thanks to a deadline extension from the NFL. But, the remainder of their home games were not shown on local television, because the games didn't sell out. The Raiders finished the season tied with the Jacksonville Jaguars for most TV blackouts in 2009. But, blackouts are nothing new to Oakland fans, as the Raiders have sold out only 25 of 88 regular season games, since returning to Oakland. The Raiders had 3 games with attendances under 40,000, with their lowest attendance coming in week 11 against the Bengals when they drew only 34,112.

Final roster

Schedule

Preseason

Regular season

Notes: Division games are in bold text.

† These four games were among the 16 that the NFL designated as "AFL Legacy Games", in honor of the 50th anniversary of the AFL. The Raiders wore their throwback uniforms during those four games, as did the Chargers, Jets, Chiefs and Cowboys.

Standings

Regular season results

Week 1: vs. San Diego Chargers

The Raiders began their season with a Week 1 AFL Legacy duel against their AFC West rival, the San Diego Chargers, in the second game of an MNF doubleheader.  In the first quarter, Oakland got off to a surprising good start.  While the defense (led by newly acquired defensive lineman Richard Seymour) kept the Chargers offense in control, the Raiders offense struck first with running back Michael Bush getting a 4-yard touchdown run.  San Diego would respond in the second quarter as running back LaDainian Tomlinson got a 1-yard touchdown run.  Oakland would answer with what looked like a 19-yard touchdown pass to rookie wide receiver Louis Murphy, but was overturned as he was unable to get full control of the ball.  The Raiders would have to settle with kicker Sebastian Janikowski making a 37-yard field goal, while the Chargers closed out the half with kicker Nate Kaeding getting a 47-yard field goal.

After a scoreless third quarter, Oakland regained the lead as Janikowski nailed a 35-yard field goal, but San Diego answered with quarterback Philip Rivers completing a 15-yard touchdown pass to wide receiver Vincent Jackson. Afterwards, the Raiders got the lead again as quarterback JaMarcus Russell completed a 57-yard touchdown pass to Murphy on 4th & long. However, the Chargers came right back as running back Darren Sproles got a 5-yard touchdown run. Oakland tried to rally, but an interception ended all hopes of a comeback.

With the tough loss, the Raiders began their season at 0–1.

Week 2: at Kansas City Chiefs

Hoping to rebound from their loss to the Chargers, the Raiders flew to Arrowhead Stadium for a Week 2 AFC West duel with the Kansas City Chiefs.  Oakland would trail in the first quarter as Chiefs kicker Ryan Succop got a 23-yard field goal.  The Raiders would tie the game in the second quarter as kicker Sebastian Janikowski got a 48-yard field goal.  In the third quarter, Oakland took the lead as Janikowski nailed a 54-yard field goal.  In the fourth quarter, Kansas City took the lead as quarterback Matt Cassel completed a 29-yard touchdown pass to wide receiver Dwayne Bowe.  Afterwards, Oakland claimed victory as running back Darren McFadden got the game-winning 5-yard touchdown run.

With the win, the Raiders improved to 1–1.

Week 3: vs. Denver Broncos

Coming off their divisional road win over the Chiefs, the Raiders went home for a Week 3 AFC West duel with the Denver Broncos.  Oakland would trail in the first quarter as Broncos quarterback Kyle Orton completed a 2-yard touchdown pass to wide receiver Brandon Marshall, followed by kicker Matt Prater's 48-yard field goal.  The Raiders would get on the board in the second quarter as kicker Sebastian Janikowski made a 48-yard field goal, yet Denver answered with Prater's 21-yard field goal.  From here on out, the Broncos were in control as running back Knowshon Moreno got a 7-yard touchdown run in the third quarter and Prater nailed a 24-yard field goal in the fourth quarter.

With the loss, Oakland fell to 1–2.

Week 4: at Houston Texans

Hoping to rebound from their divisional home loss to the Broncos, the Raiders flew to Reliant Stadium for a Week 4 duel with the Houston Texans.  Following a 26-yard field goal from Texans kicker Kris Brown, Oakland would answer with kicker Sebastian Janikowski's 46-yard field goal.  However, Houston would take control in the second quarter.  Following Brown's 34-yard field goal, running back Steve Slaton would get a 32-yard touchdown run and catch quarterback Matt Schaub's 18-yard touchdown pass.  The Raiders would close out the half with Janikowski's 33-yard field goal.  In the third quarter, the Texans would put Oakland out of their misery with linebacker Brian Cushing tackling running back Justin Fargas in his own end zone for a safety.  Afterwards, Houston closed out the game's scoring with wide receiver Jacoby Jones returning the immediate kickoff 95 yards for a touchdown.

With the loss, Oakland fell to 1–3.

Week 5: at New York Giants

Hoping to end a two-game losing streak, the Raiders flew to Giants Stadium for a Week 5 interconference duel with the New York Giants.  Oakland immediately trailed in the opening period as Giants running back Ahmad Bradshaw got a 1-yard and a 19-yard touchdown run.  Things continued to get worse for the Raiders in the second quarter as quarterback Eli Manning completed a 30-yard touchdown pass to wide receiver Mario Manningham and hooked up with wide receiver Hakeem Nicks.  Oakland would answer with a 5-yard touchdown run from running back Michael Bush, yet New York closed out the half with a 25-yard field goal by kicker Lawrence Tynes.  For the second half, the Giants would stay in control as quarterback David Carr got a 12-yard touchdown run and Tynes would boot a 33-yard and a 37-yard field goal.

With the loss, the Raiders fell to 1–4.

Week 6: vs. Philadelphia Eagles

Trying to snap a three-game losing streak, the Raiders went home for a Week 6 interconference duel with the Philadelphia Eagles.  In the first quarter, Philadelphia delivered the opening hit as kicker David Akers made a 45-yard field goal.  The Raiders would answer with quarterback JaMarcus Russell's 86-yard touchdown pass to tight end Zach Miller.  In the second quarter, both teams swapped field goals as Oakland's Sebastian Janikowski got a 29-yard field goal while Akers gave the Eagles a 43-yard field goal.  After a scoreless third quarter, the Raiders turned to Janikowski again in the fourth quarter as he booted a 46-yard field goal.  Philadelphia tried to make a comeback, but Oakland would only allow a 45-yard field goal from Akers.

With the win, the Raiders improved to 2–4.

Week 7: vs. New York Jets

Coming off their upset win over the Eagles, the Raiders stayed at home, donned their throwbacks, and played a Week 7 AFL Legacy game with the New York Jets.  Oakland would trail early in the first quarter as early turnovers led to a 1-yard touchdown run Thomas Jones, followed by a 3-yard touchdown run by quarterback Mark Sanchez.  The Raiders' season-long woes continued in the second quarter as New York running back Shonn Greene got an 8-yard touchdown run, followed by kicker Jay Feely booting a 39-yard field goal.  Afterwards, the Jets would pull away as Sanchez completed a 35-yard touchdown pass to wide receiver David Clowney in the third quarter, followed by Greene's 33-yard touchdown run in the fourth quarter.

With the shutout loss, Oakland fell to 2–5.

Week 8: at San Diego Chargers

Hoping to rebound from their shutout home loss to the Jets, the Raiders flew to Qualcomm Stadium for a Week 8 AFC West rematch with the San Diego Chargers.  Oakland would trail in the first quarter as Chargers running back LaDainian Tomlinson got a 6-yard touchdown run.  The Raiders answered in the second quarter as running back Justin Fargas got a 5-yard touchdown run, but San Diego replied with quarterback Philip Rivers' 8-yard touchdown pass to wide receiver Vincent Jackson and Tomlinson's 10-yard touchdown run.  Afterwards, Oakland would close out the half as kicker Sebastian Janikowski got a 48-yard field goal.

In the second quarter, the Raiders tried to rally as Janikowski nailed a 41-yard field goal in the third quarter and a 28-yard field goal in the fourth, but the Chargers pulled away with a 28-yard field goal from kicker Nate Kaeding.

With the loss, Oakland fell to 2–6 entering their bye week.

Week 10: vs. Kansas City Chiefs

Coming off their bye week, the Raiders went home, donned their throwbacks, and played a Week 10 AFL Legacy game with the Kansas City Chiefs.  In the first quarter, Oakland struck first with a 1-yard touchdown run from running back Justin Fargas.  The Chiefs would get on the boards via a 50-yard field goal from kicker Ryan Succop, yet the Raiders came right back with their own 50-yard field goal from kicker Sebastian Janikowski.  However, Kansas City would take the lead in the second quarter with running back Jamaal Charles getting a 44-yard touchdown run and Succop booting a 25-yard field goal.  After a scoreless third quarter, the Chiefs would pull away as Succop nailed a 31-yard field goal.

With the loss, Oakland fell to 2–7.

Week 11: vs. Cincinnati Bengals

Trying to snap a three-game losing streak, the Raiders stayed at home for a Week 11 duel with the Cincinnati Bengals.  Due to quarterback JaMarcus Russell's ineffectiveness, quarterback Bruce Gradkowski would get the start.

Oakland would trail in the first quarter as Bengals quarterback Carson Palmer got a 1-yard touchdown run.  Cincinnati's lead would increase as Palmer got another 1-yard touchdown run, yet the Raiders would close out the half with Gradkowski completing a 10-yard touchdown pass to tight end Zach Miller.

In the third quarter, Oakland continued to rally as kicker Sebastian Janikowski got a 52-yard field goal.  The Bengals would answer with kicker Shayne Graham nailing a 25-yard field goal.  The Raiders would tie the game in the fourth quarter as Gradkowski found rookie wide receiver Louis Murphy on a 29-yard touchdown pass.  Afterwards, after recovering a special team fumble from Cincinnati wide receiver Andre Caldwell, Oakland took advantage as Janikowski booted the game-winning 33-yard field goal.

With the win, the Raiders improved to 3–7.

Week 12: at Dallas Cowboys

With the loss, the Raiders dropped to 3–8.

Week 13: at Pittsburgh Steelers

With the win, the Raiders improved to 4–8.

Week 14: vs. Washington Redskins

With the loss, the Raiders dropped to 4–9 securing them their 6th straight losing season.

Week 15: at Denver Broncos

With the win, the Raiders improved to 5–9.

Week 16: at Cleveland Browns

With the loss, the Raiders dropped to 5–10.

Week 17: vs. Baltimore Ravens

Statistically speaking, the Ravens' victory over the Raiders also allowed the dethroning of the defending world champion Pittsburgh Steelers, who would not see any playoff contention. Whatever the case, the Raiders ended their dismal season at 5–11.

References

External links
2009 Oakland Raiders season at Pro Football Reference
2009 Oakland Raiders season at ESPN

Oakland Raiders seasons
Oakland
Raiders
Oakland